The Lunderskov-Esbjerg line is the railway between Lunderskov and Esbjerg in Southern Jutland. It was opened on 3 October 1874, along with the first part of the West Jutland longitudinal line to Varde.

History
The construction of the was authorised by a law of 24 April, 1868, together with the West Jutland longitudinal line, the Vendsyssel line and the Silkeborg line. On the same date, a law concerning the construction of the port of Esbjerg was also passed. In 1909, the railway bridge over Snæum river was destroyed by a  storm surge.

The line
 Lunderskov station, starting point on the Fredericia-Padborg Line
 former Andst station, closed as a station in 1969. The building is preserved at Stationsvej 16.
 Vejen station, former connection to the Troldhede-Kolding-Vejen railway
 Brørup station
 Holsted station
 Gørding station
 Bramming station, connection with the Bramming-Tønder line and the Diagonal line to Grindsted (formerly on to Brande- Silkeborg - Randers )
 Tjæreborg station, now only stopping for Arriva's Esbjerg-Tønder service
 Esbjerg station, starting point for the West Jutland longitudinal line to Varde-Skjern-Holstebro

Operation
From January 2003, the Esbjerg-Bramming section is operated by both Arriva and DSB, while the Bramming-Lunderskov section will only be operated by DSB.

Electrification
In the wake of the delay in the delivery of the scandal-ridden IC4 trains, it was proposed several times through the late '00s and early '10s to electrify the main line of the Danish railway network in order to be able to buy proven standard equipment to remedy the growing shortage of train equipment.  However, this was rejected just as many times, as electrification of the railway network would require a simultaneous upgrading of the signaling system, which was already being replaced throughout the country by ERTMS 2.  

In this context, the Esbjerg-Lunderskov section was interesting, because in 1997 the section had  already been almost completely upgraded in preparation for a forthcoming electrification, just before the electrification program was cancelled. On 7 February 2012, the Social Democrats, the Radical Left, SF,  Venstre, DF, Liberal Alliance and the Conservative People's Party therefore agreed to electrify the track, so it was ready for electric trains by the end of 2015.   

The main idea behind the electrification was that it would allow for the rapid purchase of 15 new electric train sets, which could replace a similar number of IC3 train sets.

Electrification was later postponed to 2016 due to economies of scale, as the contractors could thereby go directly from this section to the other sections that were to be electrified subsequently.  The electrification was begun on 6 August 2017,  but was later hit by operational problems and a complete shutdown for electric trains, due to problems with the Siemens Sicat SX overhead distribution system. After a replacement of the faulty rope wheels, the track was reopened for electric operation on 13 August 2018.

References

See also
Rail transport in Denmark
List of railway lines in Denmark

Railway lines in Denmark
Transport in Esbjerg
Transport in Denmark
Rail transport in the Region of Southern Denmark